Kareem Andre Richardson (born August 8, 1974) is an American basketball coach who is the former head coach at the University of Missouri–Kansas City (UMKC).

Richardson was fired as head coach of UMKC on March 17, 2019, after compiling a 75–118 record in six seasons. He was hired as an assistant coach at Clemson on April 22, 2021.

Head coaching record

References

External links 
Kareem Richardson Louisville Profile
Kareem Richardson Xavier Profile
Kareem Richardson Drake Profile
Kareem Richardson UMKC Profile

1974 births
Living people
American men's basketball coaches
American men's basketball players
Basketball coaches from Washington (state)
Basketball players from Tacoma, Washington
College men's basketball head coaches in the United States
Clemson Tigers men's basketball coaches
Drake Bulldogs men's basketball coaches
East Carolina Pirates men's basketball players
Evansville Purple Aces men's basketball coaches
Evansville Purple Aces men's basketball players
Indianapolis Greyhounds men's basketball coaches
Indiana State Sycamores men's basketball coaches
Louisville Cardinals men's basketball coaches
People from Champaign County, Illinois
People from Rantoul, Illinois
Kansas City Roos men's basketball coaches
Wright State Raiders men's basketball coaches
Xavier Musketeers men's basketball coaches